The 2023 Interwetten Baltic Sea Darts Open was the first of thirteen PDC European Tour events on the 2023 PDC Pro Tour. The tournament took place at the Wunderino Arena, Kiel, Germany from 24 to 26 February 2023. It featured a field of 48 players and £175,000 in prize money, with £30,000 going to the winner.

 won his fourth European Tour title by defeating  8–5 in the final.

The event also saw 239 scores of 180 hit during the tournament, beating the previous European Tour record of 231.

Prize money
The prize money was increased for the first time in 4 years for all European Tours:

 Seeded players who lost in the second round of the event were not credited with prize money on any Order of Merit.

Qualification and format
The top 16 entrants from the PDC ProTour Order of Merit on 31 January 2023 automatically qualified for the event and were seeded in the second round.

The remaining 32 places went to players from six qualifying events – 24 from the Tour Card Holder Qualifier (held on 13 February), two from the Associate Member Qualifier (held on 10 February), the two highest ranked Germans automatically qualified, alongside two from the Host Nation Qualifier (held on 10 February), one from the Nordic & Baltic Associate Member Qualifier (held on 17 February), and one from the East European Associate Member Qualifier (held on 11 February).

The following players took part in the tournament:

Top 16
  (Runner-up)
  (Second round)
  (Third round)
  (Second round)
  (Third round)
  (Champion)
  (Second round)
  (Third round)
  (Quarter-finals)
  (Third round)
  (Third round)
  (Second round)
  (Semi-finals)
  (Quarter-finals)
  (Semi-finals)
  (Third round)

Tour Card Qualifier
  (First round)
  (Second round)
  (Second round)
  (First round)
  (Second round)
  (First round)
  (Third round)
  (Quarter-finals)
  (Second round)
  (Second round)
  (Second round)
  (First round)
  (First round)
  (Quarter-finals)
  (Second round)
  (Second round)
  (First round)
  (First round)
  (First round)
  (First round)
  (First round)
  (First round)
  (Second round)
  (Second round)

Associate Member Qualifier
  (Third round)
  (First round)

Highest Ranking Germans
  (First round)
  (First round)

Host Nation Qualifier
  (Second round)
  (Second round)

Nordic & Baltic Qualifier
  (First round)

East European Qualifier
  (First round)

Draw
The draw was confirmed on 23 February.

References

2023 PDC Pro Tour
2023 PDC European Tour
2023 in German sport
Baltic Sea Darts Open